The Captain from Köpenick is a 1931 German comedy film directed by Richard Oswald and produced by Gabriel Pascal. It is one of several films based on the 1931 play of the same name by Carl Zuckmayer. The story centers on the Hauptmann von Köpenick affair in 1906.

It was shot at the Johannisthal Studios in Berlin and on location in Köpenick. The film's sets were designed by the art director Franz Schroedter.

Plot
Der Hauptmann von Köpenick is based on a true story that took place in Germany in 1906. A poor cobbler named Wilhelm Voigt purchased the second-hand uniform of a Prussian infantry captain. Wearing this, he travelled to the borough of Köpenick and ordered a troop of guardsmen to place themselves under his command. He then declared the town hall to be under military law, ordering the arrest of the mayor and treasurer and confiscating all the funds in the exchequer. In this film version it's a considerable sum of 4,000 reichsmarks. Voigt's orders were obeyed without question and he temporarily got away with the caper, although he was eventually caught.

Cast

See also
 The Captain from Köpenick (1926 film)
 The Captain from Köpenick (1945 film)
 The Captain from Köpenick (1956 film)
 Der Hauptmann von Köpenick (1997 film)

References

Bibliography

External links
 
 The film on dvd

1931 films
1930s historical comedy-drama films
German historical comedy-drama films
German biographical films
Biographical films about fraudsters
German black-and-white films
Films of the Weimar Republic
1930s German-language films
Films set in 1906
Films set in Berlin
Films about con artists
Films directed by Richard Oswald
Films produced by Gabriel Pascal
German films based on plays
Comedy films based on actual events
Films based on works by Carl Zuckmayer
Films shot at Johannisthal Studios
Cultural depictions of Wilhelm Voigt
1930s German films